The Otago Rescue Helicopter trust is an emergency helicopter service covering the lower South Island area of New Zealand, used for accident and medical air ambulance missions, and search and rescue. , the service operates a MBB/Kawasaki BK 117 B-2 helicopter, with two other BK 117s as backup to the primary rescue helicopter. It is run by a charitable trust formed in 1998, with major sponsor the Otago Regional Council. Based at Taieri Aerodrome near Mosgiel, it covers 25 percent of the country's land area. Retrieval missions typically transport patients to Dunedin Hospital, and the service works in cooperation with New Zealand's main ambulance provider, St John New Zealand. Around 400 missions and 600 flying hours are undertaken each year.

History
The organisation was set up in August 1997 and formed into a trust in the following years. Co-founders were Michael Coburn and Ross Black, with Black being the chairman of the trust until his retirement in March 2019.

Equipment
Some of the BK117 aircraft are fitted with a  winch (HUP, sometimes IWG), a 30 million candlepower searchlight, and a neonatal intensive-care incubator. On board the crew has night vision goggles, dual GPS, satellite phone and a range of communications equipment. ZK-IWG, HUP and IWD are all capable of IFR flight.

Notable missions
The boat owner activated an EPIRB beacon, allowing the helicopter to fly directly to the site using direction-finding equipment. It recovered two survivors suffering hypothermia, and the body of a third man. One of the helicopter crew then radioed a mayday call to shipping for the two other men, who were later presumed drowned.

Funding
The Otago Rescue Helicopter Trust was founded in 1998 to meet the cost of running the service, and funded the construction of the helipad on the roof of Dunedin Public Hospital. Operational funding is on a per call basis depending on the nature of the mission – the Accident Compensation Corporation for accidents, hospitals for inter-hospital transfers and the New Zealand Police for search and rescue. The service needs an additional NZ$400,000 – 500,000 annually, since 2008 the Otago Regional Council provides $250,000 per year. From 2002 until April 2008, the Lion Foundation sponsored the service.

See also
 Emergency medical services in New Zealand
 Westpac Rescue Helicopter (New Zealand)

References

External links

 Official website
 Helicopters Otago – Air Ambulance history

Air ambulance services in New Zealand
Charities based in New Zealand
Otago
1997 establishments in New Zealand
Organizations established in 1997